Aleksandr Sergeyevich Bukleyev (born 17 February 1984) is a former Russian association football midfielder. Bukleyev mainly played as an attacking left winger although he has played as an attacking left wing back in the past. He was also a very hard working player who often tracks back and was a solid marker and sliding tackler.

Club career
Bukleyev began his career with FC Krylia Sovetov Samara's reserve team, before joining FC Sheksna Cherepovets in the Russian Second Division.

Beroe
Bukleyev moved to FC Beroe Stara Zagora for the 2008 season, and made his official debut for Beroe in a match against Levski Sofia on 8 March 2008. He played for 90 minutes. The result of the match was 0:1 with lose for Beroe. On 29 March 2008 he scored his first goal for Beroe against Botev Plovdiv, scoring in 79th minute. The result of the match 3:1 and win for Beroe.

References

1984 births
Sportspeople from Samara, Russia
Living people
Russian footballers
Russian expatriate footballers
Expatriate footballers in Bulgaria
Association football midfielders
PFC Beroe Stara Zagora players
First Professional Football League (Bulgaria) players
PFC Krylia Sovetov Samara players
Russian expatriate sportspeople in Bulgaria
FC Sheksna Cherepovets players